Qari Muammar Zainal Asyikin (Mu'ammar Zayn-al Ashqeen; born 14 June 1954) sometimes shortened Muammar ZA or Muammar Za is a popular senior Qari or Quran reciter and Hafiz from Indonesia well known nationally and internationally. He won Qur'an Recitation Contests known as "Musabaqah Tilawatil Quran" ("MTQ") during the 1980s in Indonesia and abroad. His talent was recognised during childhood in his hometown Pemalang where he participated and won a local children's Quran Competition in 1962 when he was just 7 years of age H. Muammar, a national reciter, was renowned internationally for his breath capacity (the longest in the world, it was said).

He is known to have a myriad of achievements related to Qur'an reading competitions. In 1967 he achieved the first place in the Quran Reciting Competition ("MTQ") of Jogjakarta Province, and after that winning in 1972 and 1973 representing Jogjakarta province in the national level of Quran Reciting Competition in Indonesia. In 1979 and 1986 he won the International level Quran Reciting Competition, and because of his achievements, he was invited to recite in Istana Nurul Iman of Brunei, National Palace of Malaysia, and until the Middle East.

He was invited by Jamia Binoria to recite the Quran in Pakistan in 2009. He was also invited to recite in Turkey (IGMG Aileler Günü)  in 2004.

Background
Qari Muammar is the seventh child of ten, of which only nine lived to adulthood, of H. Zainal Asykin and Hj. Mu’minatul Afifah who were religious figures of their home village. Qari Muammar was born in Moga district which is approximately 40 km south from the capital city of Pemalang Regency in Central Java. He has a younger brother named Imron Rosyadi Z.A who has followed in his brother's footsteps to become a Qari. Muammar married a woman from Aceh named Syarifah Nadiya in 1984 and has a daughter and four sons.

In 2002, Muammar established an Islamic Boarding School or "Pesantren" called "Pesantren Ummul Qura" (Arabic: أم القرى) located in Cipondoh, Tangerang to build future professional Qaris from a young age.

See also
Maria Ulfah
Mu'min Ainul Mubarak

References 

1954 births
Indonesian Muslims
Indonesian Quran reciters
Javanese people
Quran reciters
Living people
People from Pemalang Regency
Indonesian people of Egyptian descent
Indonesian people of Arab descent
Universal Music Group artists